Moody McCarthy (born Matthew Patrick McCarthy) is an American stand-up comedian who has made multiple network TV appearances.  McCarthy was raised in Syracuse, New York, the 6th of 7 children, and graduated from Corcoran High School in 1984, before attending New York University.

McCarthy married Molly Mandell in 2012.

References

External links
Moody McCarthy website

American stand-up comedians
Living people
1967 births
21st-century American comedians